Bechem is a town in Ghana

Bechem may also refer to:
 Bechem United F.C., a Ghanaian football club 
 Berekum Chelsea F.C., a Ghanaian football club formerly known as Bechem Chelsea Football Club
 Günther Bechem, (1921 – 2011) was a racing driver from Germany

See also 

 Beckham (disambiguation)